Glen Glass (born September 10, 1965) is an American politician from Maryland and a member of the Republican Party. He is a former member of the Maryland House of Delegates from District 34A in Cecil County and Harford County.

Biography
Glen Glass was born on September 10, 1965, in Riverdale, Maryland. He earned a GED from Hope High School in 1988. He later attended Howard Community College, where he earned an A.A. (business management) in 1993, then a B.A. from the University of Baltimore in 1994.

Glass served in the United States Army from 1987 to 1989. He worked as a teacher at the Northeast Middle School in Baltimore. He has worked as an environmental services specialist with FCC Environmental since 2000. Glass served as a member of the Maryland House of Delegates, representing District 34A in Cecil County and Harford County, from January 12, 2011, to January 9, 2019.

Glass is married with one child.

Election results
2014 General Election Results Maryland House of Delegates – District 34A - Harford County
Voters to choose two:
{| class="wikitable"
!Name
!Votes
!Percent
!Outcome
|-
|-
|Glen Glass, Rep.
|10,779
|  28.41%
|   Won
|-
|-
|Mary Ann Lisanti, Dem.
|10,015
|  26.40%
|   Won
|-
|-
|Mike Blizzard, Rep.
|9,041
|  23.83%
|   Lost
|-
|-
|Marla Posey-Moss, Dem.
|8,057
|  21.24%
|   Lost
|-
|Write-Ins
|49
|  0.13%
|   Lost
|}

2010 General Election Results Maryland House of Delegates – District 34A - Cecil & Harford County
Voters to choose two:
{| class="wikitable"
!Name
!Votes
!Percent
!Outcome
|-
|-
|Mary-Dulany James, Dem.
|12,639
|  29.2%
|   Won
|-
|-
|Glen Glass, Rep.
|10,931
|  25.3%
|   Won
|-
|-
|Patrick McGrady, Rep.
|9,889
|  22.9%
|   Lost
|-
|-
|Marla Posey-Moss, Dem.
|9,745
|  22.5%
|   Lost
|-
|Write-Ins
|51
|  0.1%
|   Lost
|}

2006 General Election Results Maryland House of Delegates – District 34A - Cecil & Harford County
Voters to choose two:
{| class="wikitable"
!Name
!Votes
!Percent
!Outcome
|-
|-
|Mary-Dulany James, Dem.
|12,697
|  31.7%
|   Won
|-
|-
|B. Daniel Riley, Dem.
|10,969
|  27.3%
|   Won
|-
|-
|Glen Glass, Rep.
|8,554
|  21.0%
|   Lost
|-
|-
|Sheryl Davis Kohl, Rep.
|8,085
|  19.9%
|   Lost
|-
|Write-Ins
|22
|  0.1%
|   Lost
|}

References and notes

Living people
1965 births
People from Anne Arundel County, Maryland
United States Army soldiers
Republican Party members of the Maryland House of Delegates
21st-century American politicians
Howard Community College alumni
University of Baltimore alumni